The Kórnik Arboretum in Kórnik, in western Poland, is the largest and oldest arboretum in Poland and fourth-largest arboretum in Europe, with over 3300 taxa of trees and shrubs.  It was established in the early 19th century around the historical Kórnik Castle by its owner, Count Tytus Działyński, later enriched with new species and varieties by his heirs, his son Jan Kanty Działyński and grandson Władysław Zamoyski.

Old specimens of native and alien trees and shrubs can be seen there, such as lindens, beeches, oaks, maidenhair trees, arborvitaes, spruces, and firs.

The Institute of Dendrology of the Polish Academy of Sciences is located within the arboretum.

In 2010, a 3.5-kilometre long educational trail called Trees of the World was opened in the arboretum. It enables visitors to see and obtain botanical information on 25 major species of trees found in North America, Asia and Europe.

See also 

 Arboretum
 Botanical garden
 Kórnik Castle

Gallery

References

External links 
 Website of the Institute of Dendrology, which owns the arboretum

Arboreta in Poland
Gardens in Poland
Museums in Greater Poland Voivodeship
19th-century establishments in Poland
Poznań County
Tourist attractions in Greater Poland Voivodeship
Natural history museums in Poland